Tony Curtis (1925–2010) was an American actor.

Tony or Anthony Curtis may also refer to:

Tony Curtis (Irish poet) (born 1955), Irish poet 
Tony Curtis (Welsh poet) (born 1946), Welsh poet and author
Tony Curtis (American football) (born 1983), American football tight end
Anthony Curtis (writer), gambler and author
Anthony Curtis (character), a fictional character from the 1995 film Dead Presidents
Anthony Curtis (whaler) (1796–1853), Australian whaler and businessman